Callicore eunomia, the Eunomia eighty-eight or Eunomia numberwing, is a species of butterfly of the family Nymphalidae. It is found in the upper Amazonian region, from Colombia and Guyana to Brazil, Peru, and Bolivia.

The wingspan is 30–40 mm. Adults are black with a broad, orange or red area on the forewings and a blue area on the hindwings. There is a rare form, ab. confluens, found in central Peru, in which the black markings on the underside are greatly enlarged.

Renowned lepidopterist William Chapman Hewitson provided the first description of the "eighty-eight" in 1853.

Subspecies
Callicore eunomia eunomia (Ecuador, Peru)
Callicore eunomia incarnata (Röber, 1915) (Bolivia, Peru)
Callicore eunomia valeriae Neild, 1996 (Venezuela)
Callicore eunomia ferrerorum Attal, 2000 (Venezuela)
Callicore eunomia alani Attal & Crosson du Cormier, 2003

References

Biblidinae
Lepidoptera of Brazil
Nymphalidae of South America
Butterflies described in 1853